The Sunday Mail is a newspaper published on Sunday in Brisbane, Queensland, Australia. It is Brisbane's only Sunday newspaper. The Sunday Mail is published in tabloid format, comprising several sections that can be extracted and read separately. It is available for purchase throughout Queensland, most regions of Northern New South Wales and parts of the Northern Territory.

Publishing
The newspaper is published by Queensland Newspapers, part of News Corp Australia, whose parent company is News Corp.  The editorial office is located at Bowen Hills, in Brisbane's inner northern suburbs, and the newspaper is printed in the suburb of Murarrie.

Liz Deegan succeeded Michael Prain as editor in September 2006. Prain, who was editor of the newspaper for almost a decade, was appointed managing editor, digital media, of Queensland Newspapers. As she prepared to take over as editor, Deegan said: "I'm excited by the challenge of editing the biggest -selling newspaper in Australia's fastest growing state and ensuring its circulation keeps pace with the rapid growth of Queensland."

The December 2006 Roy Morgan Readership poll put the newspaper's circulation at 601,357, with readership at 1,515,000, making it the third most read Sunday newspaper in Australia.

The Sunday Mail was published in a new design, featuring a new masthead, updated typography and somewhat different supplements on 15 July 2007.

In June 2013, The Sunday Mail announced that Peter Gleeson would take over the role of editor from Scott Thompson. As of 2013 The Sunday Mail costs A$2.50.

As of 2021, The Sunday Mail costs A$3.50.

Digitisation
The paper has been digitised up until 26 December 1954 as part of the Australian Newspapers Digitisation Program of the National Library of Australia.

See also 
 The Courier-Mail
 List of newspapers in Australia

References

External links
 
 

Weekly newspapers published in Australia
News Corp Australia
Newspapers published in Brisbane
Newspapers on Trove